The 2023 UEFA European Under-21 Championship (also known as UEFA Under-21 Euro 2023) will be the 24th edition of the UEFA European Under-21 Championship (27th edition if the Under-23 era is also included), the biennial international youth football championship organised by UEFA for the men's under-21 national teams of Europe.  A total of 16 teams will play in the final tournament, and only players born on or after 1 January 2000 are eligible to participate.

The tournament will be co-hosted by Romania and Georgia. Romania will host the opening match, while Georgia will host the final. Romania already hosted the 1998 UEFA European Under-21 Championship.

Same as previous Under-21 Championships that were held one year prior to the Olympics, this tournament will serve as European qualifying for the Olympic football tournament. Besides France which qualify automatically as Olympic hosts, eligible teams will compete for qualifying for the men's football tournament of the 2024 Summer Olympics in Paris, where they will be represented by their under-23 national teams with maximum of three overage players allowed.

Germany are the defending champions.

Host selection
Both Romania and Georgia bid for the tournament separately. The two countries were appointed as co-hosts at the UEFA Executive Committee meeting on 3 December 2020.

Qualification

Qualified teams
The following teams qualified for the final tournament.

Note: All appearance statistics include only U-21 era (since 1978).

Notes

Final draw
The final draw was held on 18 October 2022, 18:00 CET in Bucharest. The sixteen teams were drawn into four groups of four teams. The teams were seeded according to their coefficient ranking following the end of the qualifying stage, calculated based on the following:
2019 UEFA European Under-21 Championship final tournament and qualifying competition (20%)
2021 UEFA European Under-21 Championship final tournament and qualifying competition (40%)
2023 UEFA European Under-21 Championship qualifying competition (group stage only) (40%)

The hosts Romania and Georgia were assigned to positions A1 and B1, respectively, while the remaining fourteen teams were drawn to the other available positions in their group.

Venues

Romania
The Federația Română de Fotbal originally proposed the following eight venues:
Arena Națională in Bucharest, Romania
Steaua Stadium in Bucharest, Romania
Rapid-Giulești Stadium in Bucharest, Romania
Arcul de Triumf Stadium in Bucharest, Romania
Cluj Arena in Cluj-Napoca, Romania
Dr. Constantin Rădulescu Stadium in Cluj-Napoca, Romania
Ilie Oană Stadium in Ploiești, Romania
Marin Anastasovici Stadium in Giurgiu, Romania

However, four stadiums were removed from the list of venues since Georgia was also appointed as host.

Georgia
In Georgia, the tournament will also be played at four stadiums. Initially these venues were proposed:
Adjarabet Arena, Batumi
Fazisi Stadium, Poti
Boris Paichadze Dinamo Arena, Tbilisi
Mikheil Meskhi Stadium, Tbilisi
Based on recommendation of the UEFA organizing group experts, in January 2022 Fazisi Stadium was replaced by Ramaz Shengelia Stadium located in Kutaisi.

Group stage
The group winners and runners-up advance to the quarter-finals.

Tiebreakers
In the group stage, teams are ranked according to points (3 points for a win, 1 point for a draw, 0 points for a loss), and if tied on points, the following tiebreaking criteria are applied, in the order given, to determine the rankings (Regulations Articles 18.01 and 18.02):
Points in head-to-head matches among tied teams;
Goal difference in head-to-head matches among tied teams;
Goals scored in head-to-head matches among tied teams;
If more than two teams are tied, and after applying all head-to-head criteria above, a subset of teams are still tied, all head-to-head criteria above are reapplied exclusively to this subset of teams;
Goal difference in all group matches;
Goals scored in all group matches;
Penalty shoot-out if only two teams have the same number of points, and they meet in the last round of the group and are tied after applying all criteria above (not used if more than two teams have the same number of points, or if their rankings are not relevant for qualification for the next stage);
Disciplinary points (red card = 3 points, yellow card = 1 point, expulsion for two yellow cards in one match = 3 points);
UEFA coefficient ranking for the final draw.

All times are local, EEST (UTC+3) in Romania and GET (UTC+4) in Georgia.

Group A

Group B

Group C

Group D

Knockout stage
In the knockout stage, extra time and a penalty shoot-out are used to decide the winners if necessary.

Bracket

Quarter-finals

Semi-finals

Final

Qualified teams for 2024 Summer Olympics
The following four teams from UEFA qualified for the 2024 Summer Olympic men's football tournament including France which qualified as the hosts.

1 Bold indicates champions for that year. Italic indicates hosts for that year.

References

External links

 
2023
Under-21 Championship
Scheduled association football competitions
2023 in youth association football
International association football competitions hosted by Romania
International association football competitions hosted by Georgia (country)
UEFA Europe
Sports events affected by the 2022 Russian invasion of Ukraine
UEFA
UEFA